The Tecșe (in its upper course also: Nireș) is a left tributary of the river Aita in Romania. It flows into the Aita south of Aita Seacă.

Tributaries

The following rivers are tributaries to the river Tecșe (from source to mouth):

Left: Ivan, Anaș, Pârâul Bradului, Pârâul Ierbos, Pietrosu de Sus, Pietrosu de Jos, Pârâul Minei, Cacuci
Right: Catrina, Izvorul Bogat

References

Rivers of Romania
Rivers of Covasna County